Asko Parpola (born 12 July 1941, in Forssa) is a Finnish Indologist, current professor emeritus of South Asian studies at the University of Helsinki. He specializes in Sindhology, specifically the study of the Indus script.

Biography 
Parpola is a brother of the Akkadian language epigrapher Simo Parpola. He is married to Marjatta Parpola, who has authored a study on the traditions of Kerala's Nambudiri Brahmins.

Scholarship 
Parpola's research and teaching interests fall within the following topics:
 Indus Civilization / Indus script and religion / Corpus of Indus Seals and Inscriptions
 Veda / Vedic ritual / Samaveda / Jaiminiya Samaveda texts and rituals / Purva-Mimamsa
 South Asian religions / Hinduism / Saiva and Sakta tradition / Goddess Durga
 South India / Kerala / Tamil Nadu / Karnataka
 Sanskrit / Malayalam / Kannada / Tamil / Prehistory of Indian languages
 Prehistoric archaeology of South Asia and (in broad sense) Central Asia / Coming of the Aryans

Two significant contributions of Parpola, to the field of decipherment of the Indus script, are the creation of the now universally used classification of Indus valley seals, and the proposed, and much-debated, decipherment of the language of the script.

Dravidian hypothesis 

According to Parpola the Indus script and Harappan language are "most likely to have belonged to the Dravidian family". Parpola led a Finnish team in the 1960s–80s that vied with Knorozov's Soviet team in investigating the inscriptions using computer analysis. Based on a proto-Dravidian assumption, they proposed readings of many signs, some agreeing with the suggested readings of Heras and Knorozov (such as equating the "fish" sign with the Dravidian word for fish "min") but disagreeing on several other readings. A comprehensive description of Parpola's work until 1994 is given in his book Deciphering the Indus Script. He states in his book that the Brahui people of Pakistan are remnants of the Harappan culture.

Publications 
 Books
 1994: Deciphering the Indus Script, Cambridge University Press, 
 2015: The Roots of Hinduism: The Early Aryans and the Indus Civilization, Oxford University Press, 

 Selected articles
 1988: The coming of the Aryans to Iran and India and the cultural and ethnic identity of the Dāsas, Studia Orientalia, Vol. 64, pp. 195–302. The Finnish Oriental Society.
 2008: Is the Indus script indeed not a writing system? In: Airāvati: Felicitation volume in honour of Iravatham Mahadevan: 111–31. VARALAARU.COM, Chennai.

Reception 
Parpola's long journal article The Coming of the Aryans is widely cited by historians and scholars of Indo-European Studies. Colin Renfrew, who has reviewed the article, called it a "richly annotated and well-illustrated essay," which brings together a number of different lines of arguments, including literary and archaeological. It contains rich and interesting insights into a variety of topics, including the "amalgamation of the Aryan and Dasa religions," and the Nuristani language. However, Renfrew found Parpola's methodology wanting because, to him, it did not clearly lay out the structure of the argument and the underlying assumptions. He listed the underlying assumptions as the one that the Aryans considered themselves immigrants in the lands described in their texts and the one that the Dasas were themselves immigration populations. He considered both these propositions to be doubtful.

Awards 
Asko Parpola received the Kalaignar M. Karunanidhi Classical Tamil Award for 2009 on June 23, 2010 at the World Classical Tamil Conference at Coimbatore. In 2015, he was awarded India's Presidential Award of Certificate of Honour in Sanskrit.

He is an honorary member of the American Oriental Society and, since 1990, a member of the Finnish Academy of Science and Letters.

Notes

References

External links 
Asko Parpola at Harappa.com
Publications of Asko Parpola in the Tuhat Research Database of the University of Helsinki.

1941 births
Living people
People from Forssa
Finnish Indologists
Linguists from Finland
Finnish Sindhologists
Paleolinguists
Linguists of Harappan
Academic staff of the University of Helsinki
Members of the Finnish Academy of Science and Letters